Élton Rodrigues Brandão (born 1 August 1985), simply known as Élton, is a Brazilian professional footballer who plays as a striker Currently without a club.

Career statistics

Honours

Club
Santo André
Campeonato Paulista Série A2: 2008

Vasco
Campeonato Brasileiro Série B: 2009
Copa do Brasil: 2011

Corinthians
Copa Libertadores: 2012

Al-Nassr
Saudi Crown Prince Cup: 2013–14
Saudi Professional League: 2013–14

Cuiabá
Campeonato Mato-Grossense: 2021, 2022

References

External links
 CBF profile 
 
 
 

1985 births
Living people
Brazilian footballers
Brazilian expatriate footballers
Legia Warsaw players
Iraty Sport Club players
Esporte Clube Santo André players
Associação Desportiva São Caetano players
CR Vasco da Gama players
Sport Club Corinthians Paulista players
Esporte Clube Vitória players
Clube Náutico Capibaribe players
S.C. Braga players
Al Nassr FC players
CR Flamengo footballers
JEF United Chiba players
Ceará Sporting Club players
Figueirense FC players
Sport Club do Recife players
Cuiabá Esporte Clube players
Centro Sportivo Alagoano players
Campeonato Brasileiro Série A players
Campeonato Brasileiro Série B players
Ekstraklasa players
Primeira Liga players
J2 League players
Brazilian expatriate sportspeople in Poland
Expatriate footballers in Poland
Brazilian expatriate sportspeople in Portugal
Expatriate footballers in Portugal
Brazilian expatriate sportspeople in Saudi Arabia
Expatriate footballers in Saudi Arabia
Expatriate footballers in Japan
Saudi Professional League players
Association football forwards